The 1998 Cerveza Club Colombia Open was a men's tennis tournament played on Clay in Bogotá, Colombia that was part of the International Series of the 1998 ATP Tour. It was the fifth edition of the tournament and was held from 2 November – 8 November.

Champions

Singles

 Mariano Zabaleta def.  Ramón Delgado, 6–4, 6–4.

Doubles

 Diego del Río /  Mariano Puerta  def.  Gábor Köves /  Eric Taino, 6–7, 6–3, 6–2.

References

Cerveza Club Colombia Open
Bancolombia Open
1998 in Colombian tennis